This is a list of earthquakes in the Democratic Republic of the Congo which directly impacted the country.

Earthquakes

See also 
 List of earthquakes in Algeria
 List of earthquakes in Egypt
 List of earthquakes in Morocco

References

Democratic Republic of Congo
Earthquakes in the Democratic Republic of the Congo
Earthquakes